Longwood Historic District may refer to:

 Longwood Historic District (Longwood, Florida)
 Longwood Historic District (Brookline, Massachusetts), listed on the NRHP in Massachusetts
 Longwood Historic District (Bronx), New York

See also
Longwood (disambiguation)